Casey Austin Keenum (born February 17, 1988) is an American football quarterback for the Houston Texans of the National Football League (NFL). He played college football for Houston, where he became the NCAA's all-time leader in total passing yards, touchdowns, and completions. In the 2008 college football season, Keenum ranked first nationally in total offense and second in total passing yards.

During the 2011 season, Keenum became the Football Bowl Subdivision's all-time leader in total offense, as well as the all-time leader in total passing yards and touchdown passes by an FBS quarterback. As a result of his on-field contributions to Houston's success, Keenum was named to several All-American lists. He is the only quarterback in Division I FBS football history to have passed for more than 5,000 yards in each of three seasons.

After being signed by the Houston Texans as an undrafted free agent in 2012, Keenum threw for 1,760 yards and 9 touchdowns in the eight games he started for the Texans, before being waived prior to the 2014 season. He was then signed to the St. Louis Rams' practice squad and then re-signed with the Texans later in 2014. In 2015, the Rams (who later relocated to Los Angeles) traded a draft pick to the Texans for Keenum, where he played until signing as a free agent with the Minnesota Vikings in 2017.

After starter Sam Bradford was injured, Keenum came in and had a career year, setting highs in starts, passing yards, completions, and touchdowns. He led the Vikings to a 13-win regular season, followed by a last-second win, known as the Minneapolis Miracle, over the New Orleans Saints in the playoffs. Following that, Keenum played for the Denver Broncos, the Washington Redskins and the Cleveland Browns. He is known for being a journeyman quarterback by having played for seven different NFL teams.

High school career
Keenum played football for Wylie High School in Abilene, Texas. During his high school football career, he passed for 6,783 yards and 48 touchdowns and rushed for 41 touchdowns and 2,000 yards for the Bulldogs. Logging 42 starts at quarterback, Keenum posted a career record of 31–11. In 2004, Keenum led Wylie in the game-winning drive for a 17–14 victory over Cuero High School of Cuero, Texas in the Texas Class 3A Division I Championship. Keenum earned varsity letters in basketball and track during his high school career.

In addition to being recruited by the University of Houston, Keenum received walk-on offers from Baylor, Missouri, North Texas, and UTEP, but Houston was the only FBS university to offer him a scholarship over FCS offers from Sam Houston State and Stephen F Austin.

College career

2006 season

Keenum began his college career for the Houston Cougars during the 2006 season. During Keenum's freshman season, senior Kevin Kolb held the starting quarterback position for the Cougars, leading the coaching staff to redshirt Keenum for the season. The 2006 Cougars won the Conference USA championship, and Kolb was drafted by the NFL's Philadelphia Eagles.

2007 season

In fall camp before the 2007 season, the Cougars held a de facto quarterback competition to fill the starting spot vacated by the departure of four-year starter Kevin Kolb. The competition swung between Keenum and sophomore Blake Joseph throughout two-a-days and during much of the season, with each player displaying a different set of strengths and weaknesses. Keenum made his first collegiate appearance on September 1, 2007, when the Cougars opened the season at Oregon. He threw for 179 yards and a touchdown on 14-of-27 passing and added 47 rushing yards on nine carries against the Ducks. Against C-USA rival Tulane in the second game, Keenum threw for 185 yards and a touchdown on 13-of-21 passing, leading Houston to a 34–10 win. In the third game of the year against Colorado State, Keenum came on in relief of starter Blake Joseph and accounted for four touchdowns. For this performance, Keenum was recognized as CollegeSportsReport.com's Division I FBS National Performer of the Week. Keenum played at quarterback in all thirteen games of the season, starting in seven. Late in the season, the Houston coaching staff selected Keenum to be the regular starting quarterback over Joseph. Keenum's outstanding pocket presence and efficient passing won out in the end over Joseph's stronger arm and running ability. Overall, he finished with 2,259 passing yards, 14 touchdowns, and 10 interceptions.

2008 season

During the 2008 season, Keenum became the second player in school history to complete over 5,000 passing yards in one season. He also led the nation in total offense, and was the national runner-up in passing yards, behind Texas Tech's Graham Harrell. The Houston Cougars showed many signs of improvement, winning their first bowl game since 1980 with a victory over Air Force, and defeating two nationally-ranked opponents. Following the season, Keenum won the 2008 Conference USA Offensive Player of the Year award.

2009 season

Keenum led the Houston Cougars to a 10–4 record in 2009. Keenum finished the 2009 season with 48 total touchdowns and over 5,800 total offensive yards. His play helped Houston upset then #5-ranked Oklahoma State, Texas Tech, and later Mississippi State. Houston played East Carolina on the road in the Conference USA Championship, but lost the game in the final minute. Houston faced Air Force in a rematch of the previous year's Armed Forces Bowl and this time Air Force emerged victorious. In cold, windy conditions, Keenum threw six interceptions in the game, and was held to only one touchdown. He finished in eighth place in the Heisman Trophy voting in the 2009 season. He was named as the Conference USA Most Valuable Player and won the Sammy Baugh Trophy.

2010 season

Keenum was in a position to challenge more than one major NCAA division one passing record at the start of the 2010 season, including career passing yards and touchdowns. But after throwing for a total of 636 passing yards and three touchdowns in three games, Keenum tore his ACL during the Cougars' third game of the season against UCLA. The injury ended Keenum's season, and Houston finished 5–7. Keenum earned his bachelor's degree in business administration from the University of Houston Bauer College of Business in December 2010.

2011 season

On January 14, 2011, the NCAA granted Keenum a sixth year of eligibility. Prior to the 2011 season, he was named the 2011 Conference USA Preseason Offensive Player of the Year for the third year in a row. On October 27, 2011, Keenum set the all-time NCAA Division I passing touchdowns record by throwing for nine touchdowns against Rice. Keenum also enrolled in the University of Houston College of Liberal Arts and Social Sciences studying for a master's degree in sports and fitness administration.

Keenum surpassed Timmy Chang's record for most career passing yards in NCAA history on November 5, 2011. Weeks later on November 19, 2011, Keenum set the record for career completions in a 37–7 win over SMU. The Cougars had a record of 12–0 coming into the Conference USA Championship, but were defeated by Southern Miss 49–28. Keenum completed 41 of 67 pass attempts for 373 yards through the air, two touchdown passes, and two interceptions. After the loss, Houston played Penn State in the TicketCity Bowl, where they won 30–14. Keenum passed for 532 yards, and threw three touchdown passes. In the 2011 season, he finished in 7th place in the Heisman Trophy voting. For the second time, he was named as the Conference USA Most Valuable Player and won the Sammy Baugh Trophy.

Statistics

Awards

 2× Sammy Baugh Trophy (2009, 2011)
 2× Conference USA Most Valuable Player (2009, 2011)
 Conference USA Offensive Player of the Year (2008)
 Conference USA Freshman of the Year (2007)

NCAA records
As of the end of the 2020 college football season, Keenum holds the following NCAA individual records:
 Most career pass completions: 1,546
 Most career passing yards: 19,217
 Most career passing touchdowns: 155
 Most career games with 300+ passing yards: 39
 Most games with 300+ passing yards in a single season: 14 (tied with Tulsa's Paul Smith)
 Most seasons passing for 5,000+ yards: 3
 Most seasons passing for 4,000+ yards: 3 (tied with four others)
 Most career total yards: 20,114
 Most career touchdowns responsible for: 178

Professional career

Houston Texans

2012 season: Rookie year

Despite his success in college, Keenum went undrafted and signed with the Houston Texans and was placed on their practice squad for his entire rookie season.

2013 season

In 2013, Keenum was placed on the Texans' 53-man roster as a third-string quarterback behind starter Matt Schaub and backup quarterback T. J. Yates. On October 17, head coach Gary Kubiak announced that Keenum would be the starting quarterback over backup Yates in Week 7 against the Kansas City Chiefs on October 20, after starting quarterback Schaub was unable to play due to an injury. In his professional debut on October 20, Keenum threw his first NFL touchdown, a 29-yarder to DeAndre Hopkins. In the end, Keenum completed 15 of 25 passes for 271 yards and a touchdown, along with a 110.6 passer rating, the highest by a Texan quarterback in the season. Houston lost, 17–16. On November 3, Keenum threw three passing touchdowns against the Indianapolis Colts, all three to Andre Johnson in the first half. Keenum also had 350 passing yards and 26 rushing yards, despite the Texans losing 27–24. Keenum was 0–8 as a starter for the Texans in 2013.

St. Louis Rams

On August 31, 2014, Keenum was waived by the Texans to clear a roster space for recently acquired quarterback Ryan Mallett. He was claimed off waivers the next day by the St. Louis Rams. He was waived by the Rams on October 28, 2014, in order to make room on the roster for newly acquired safety Mark Barron. Keenum re-signed to the team's practice squad on October 30.

Houston Texans (second stint)

On December 15, 2014, Keenum was signed off the Rams practice squad back to the Houston Texans. He filled a roster spot after starting quarterback Ryan Fitzpatrick broke his left leg in a game against the Indianapolis Colts on December 14, 2014, and on December 21, 2014, he won his first NFL game beating the Baltimore Ravens by a score of 25–13. On December 28, 2014, he won a second consecutive game with the Texans against the Jacksonville Jaguars 23–17.

St. Louis/Los Angeles Rams (second stint)

2015 season

On March 11, 2015, Keenum was acquired from the Texans for a 7th-round pick in 2016. Head coach Jeff Fisher announced that Keenum would be the backup quarterback to recently acquired Nick Foles. On November 16, the Rams named Keenum the starting quarterback after announcing they had benched Foles.

Near the end of the Rams' week-11 game against the Baltimore Ravens, Keenum suffered a concussion that left him visibly wobbly but was not removed from the game for evaluation. This led to an investigation by the NFL and the NFL Players Association.

Keenum recovered from the concussion and led the Rams to consecutive victories against the Detroit Lions, Tampa Bay Buccaneers, and Seattle Seahawks. He recorded a Rams record near-"perfect game" against the Buccaneers, achieving a 158.0 passer rating by going 14 of 17 for 234 yards and two touchdowns in the last home game in the history of the St. Louis Rams. Keenum finished the 2015 season (six games played, five as the starter) with 828 yards, four touchdowns, and one interception, with a 60.8% completion percentage.

2016 season

On January 12, 2016, the Rams officially moved back to Los Angeles. It was announced via Fisher and GM Les Snead that Keenum would be the starting quarterback heading into training camp. On April 18, 2016, Keenum signed a one-year first round restricted free-agent tender with the Los Angeles Rams. On August 6, 2016, Keenum was named as the starter in the preseason opener against the Dallas Cowboys. After the preseason, Keenum began the regular season as the starting quarterback. After a 28–0 loss to the San Francisco 49ers in the opener, he led the team to 3 straight wins over the Seattle Seahawks, Tampa Bay Buccaneers, and Arizona Cardinals.

During Week 6 at Detroit, Keenum went 27/32 with 321 yards, three touchdowns, an interception, a rushing touchdown, and set a team record with 19 consecutive completions. The Rams lost by a score of 31–28. The following week against the Giants at Twickenham Stadium, Keenum was intercepted four times as the Giants won 17–10. After the game, Rams head coach Jeff Fisher announced his decision to keep Keenum as starter. On November 15, 2016, Keenum was benched for Jared Goff, who the Rams had taken with the first overall pick in the 2016 NFL Draft.

Minnesota Vikings

On March 31, 2017, Keenum signed a one-year contract with the Minnesota Vikings.

Due to an injury to Sam Bradford, Keenum started the Week 2 game against the Pittsburgh Steelers, completing 20 of 37 passes for 167 yards in a 26–9 loss. In the next game against the Tampa Bay Buccaneers, he threw for 369 yards and three touchdowns as the Vikings won by a score of 34–17. Through Weeks 4–7, Keenum averaged 196 yards with a total of two touchdowns and two interceptions, but a record of 3–1 over the span. During Week 8, he had two touchdowns and 288 yards against the winless Cleveland Browns to enter the bye-week. After a Week 9 bye, Keenum threw for 304 yards, four touchdowns, and two interceptions against the Washington Redskins as the Vikings won their fifth straight game, 38–30. In the next game against his former team, the Los Angeles Rams, Keenum threw for 280 yards and a touchdown, resulting in 6 straight games won. On Thanksgiving Day, during Week 12 against the Detroit Lions, he finished with 282 passing yards and two touchdowns as the Vikings won 30–23. He was named the NFC Offensive Player of the Month for November after passing for 866 yards with seven touchdowns and just two interceptions.

In 15 games (14 starts) of 2017, Keenum finished with 3,547 passing yards, 22 touchdowns, seven interceptions, and a passer rating of 98.3. He was ranked 51st by his peers on the NFL Top 100 Players of 2018.

The Vikings finished the 2017 season with a 13–3 record, clinching the NFC North Division. In the NFC Divisional Round against the New Orleans Saints, Keenum finished with 318 passing yards, a touchdown, and an interception. With only 10 seconds left in the fourth quarter, Keenum threw a pass to Stefon Diggs, who ran 61 yards for the game-winning touchdown, giving the Vikings a miraculous 29–24 victory. After that he led the Vikings fans in the "skol" chant.  The next week the Vikings were defeated 38–7 by the eventual Super Bowl winners, the Philadelphia Eagles, led by Keenum's close friend and former Rams teammate Nick Foles. Keenum became a free agent on March 14, 2018.

Denver Broncos

On March 14, 2018, Keenum signed a two-year, $36 million contract with the Denver Broncos. The signing reunited him with head coach Vance Joseph, who was the defensive backs coach during Keenum's first stint with the Texans, as well as senior personnel advisor Gary Kubiak, who was the Texans' head coach.

In his Broncos' debut in the season opener against the Seattle Seahawks, Keenum threw for 329 yards, three touchdowns, and three interceptions in a 27–24 victory. In Week 5, a 34–16 loss to the New York Jets, Keenum posted a then career-high 377 passing yards, two touchdowns, and an interception. The Broncos finished the 2018 season with a 6–10 record as Keenum recorded a career-high 3,890 passing yards, 18 touchdowns, and 15 interceptions.

Washington Redskins 

On March 7, 2019, the Broncos agreed to trade Keenum along with a seventh round draft pick to the Washington Redskins in exchange for a sixth round draft pick. The deal became official on March 13, 2019. Keenum made his debut with the Redskins in Week 1 against the Philadelphia Eagles. He threw for a career-high 380 yards and three touchdowns as the Redskins lost 32–27. In the next game against the Dallas Cowboys, Keenum threw for 221 yards and two touchdowns as the Redskins lost 31–21. In the next game against the Chicago Bears, Keenum threw for 332 yards, two touchdowns, and three interceptions, one of which was returned for a touchdown, in the 31–15 loss. During Week 4 against the New York Giants, Keenum threw for 37 yards and an interception before being benched for rookie quarterback Dwayne Haskins in the second quarter. Two weeks later against the Miami Dolphins, Keenum threw for 166 yards and two touchdowns as the Redskins narrowly won their first game of the season by a score of 17–16.

During Week 8 against the Minnesota Vikings, Keenum threw for 130 yards before being knocked out with a concussion. In Week 16 against the Giants, Keenum entered the game in the third quarter after Haskins injured his ankle. During the game, Keenum threw for 158 yards and a touchdown and rushed for another touchdown during the 41–35 overtime loss. Keenum remained the starter for Week 17 and finished with 206 yards, a touchdown, and an interception in a 47–16 loss to the Cowboys. In ten games in the 2019 season, Keenum finished with 1,707 yards, 11 touchdowns, and five interceptions.

Cleveland Browns
On March 24, 2020, Keenum signed a three-year, $18 million contract with the Cleveland Browns. He served as the backup quarterback to Baker Mayfield. He made his season debut in Week 6 after Mayfield was pulled in the third quarter due to an aggravated rib injury. He completed 5 of 10 passes and threw for 46 yards in a 38–7 loss to the Pittsburgh Steelers over the course of three offensive drives.

Keenum was named the starter for the Browns Week 7 matchup against the Denver Broncos on October 20, 2021, due to a shoulder injury from Mayfield. It was his first start since Week 17 of the 2019 season.  Keenum went 21-of-33 for 199 yards and a touchdown in the 17–14 win. Keenum also started the season finale against the Cincinnati Bengals, throwing for 176 yards, two touchdowns, an interception, and losing a fumble during the 21–16 win.

Buffalo Bills
On March 20, 2022, the Browns traded Keenum to the Buffalo Bills for a 2022 seventh-round pick. The trade also reunited Keenum with Stefon Diggs, his partner in the Minneapolis Miracle, who had been on the team since 2020.

Houston Texans (third stint)
On March 17, 2023, Keenum signed with the Houston Texans again to a two-year contract.

NFL career statistics

Regular season

Postseason

Personal life
Born in Brownwood, Texas, Keenum spent his childhood in Alpine, Texas for a few years until moving to Abilene, Texas, and is the son of Steve Keenum who served as an offensive lineman and later as head football coach and athletic director at McMurry University. The elder Keenum, known for an aggressive passing offensive strategy, was also head coach at Sul Ross State, offensive coordinator at Tarleton State, and offensive line coach at Hardin–Simmons.

Keenum is married to Kimberly Keenum. They have one child together.

In 2018, Keenum authored the book Playing for More with Andrew Perloff.

Keenum is a Christian, saying after the Vikings' "Minneapolis Miracle", which led to a Vikings' win, that the best moment of his life was giving his life to Jesus Christ.

In July 2020, Keenum became part-owner of Haak Winery in Santa Fe, TX.

Keenum is a supporter of Compassion International and their “Fill the Stadium” initiative.

See also
 List of NCAA Division I FBS career passing yards leaders
 List of NCAA Division I FBS career passing touchdowns leaders
 List of NCAA major college football yearly passing leaders
 List of NCAA major college football yearly total offense leaders

References

External links

 
 Buffalo Bills bio
 Houston Cougars bio

1988 births
Living people
American Christians
American football quarterbacks
Buffalo Bills players
Cleveland Browns players
Denver Broncos players
Houston Cougars football players
Houston Texans players
Los Angeles Rams players
Minnesota Vikings players
People from Brownwood, Texas
Players of American football from Houston
Sportspeople from Abilene, Texas
St. Louis Rams players
Washington Redskins players